The Williams River is one of the two major tributaries of the Murray River in Western Australia, the other being the Hotham River.

It starts between Williams and Narrogin and flows in a general westerly direction before it joins the Hotham River to become the Murray River near Mount Saddleback.

The river has 12 tributaries including Coolakin Gully, Warrening Gully, Junction Brook, Coalling Brook, Jim Went Creek and Fitts Creek.

References 

 

Rivers of the Peel region